The Platycephalidae are a family of marine fish, most commonly referred to as flatheads. They are relatives of the popular lionfish, belonging to the order Scorpaeniformes.

Taxonomy
Platycephalidae was first proposed as a family in 1839 by the English naturalist William John Swainson. The 5th edition of Fishes of the World classifies this family within the suborder Platycephaloidei in the order Scorpaeniformes. Other authorities differ and do not consider the Scorpaeniformes to be a valid order because the Perciformes is not monophyletic without the taxa within the Scorpaeniformes being included within it. These authorities consider the Platycephalidae to belong to the suborder Platycephaloidei, along with the families Bembridae, Parabembridae, Hoplichthyidae and Plectrogeniidae  within the Perciformes.

Genera
Platycephalidae has the following genera classified within it:

Platycephalidae has been divided into as many as 5 subfamilies by some authors but Fishes of the World does not recognise subfamilies but does state that some authors recognise two subfamilies. The two subfamilies are Platycephalalinae, containing Elates and Platycephalus, and Onigociinae, containing the remaining genera. These two groupings are thought to have become divergent in the Eocene with the Platycephalinae being predominantly temperate and Onigociinae, being predominantly tropical. The basal Platycephalinae species are confined to southern Australia and the more derived taxa have diversified in the tropical Indo-West Pacific.

The genus Sorsogona is recognised by Fishbase but, apparently, it does not include the type species, Sorsogona serrulata, as a species within it. Catalog of Fishes treats this genus as a synonym of Rogadius but classifies all the species in Ratabulus, including the type species, which it treats as a synonym of Ratabulus tuberculatus.

Etymology
The name of the family is derived from the Greek words platy, meaning "flat", and kephale for "head".

Description
Platycephalids are small to medium-sized fish. Most species are small, reaching an average of 10 cm in length. Their most distinctive characteristic is the flattened shape of their heads. While the rest of their bodies is shaped similarly to other fish that inhabit the areas they frequent, their heads are triangle-shaped and dorsoventrally depressed, giving them the shape of a trowel or an artist's spatula. Their eyes are situated on the upper surface, in accordance with their bottom-dwelling lifestyle. They possess two complete dorsal fins, the first one supported by six to 9 strong spines.

Distribution and habitat
Platycephalidae can be found naturally in coastal waters throughout the Indo-Pacific. A few species have been caught in the eastern Mediterranean, having traveled there from the Red Sea through the Suez Canal.

Biology
Flatheads are mostly marine demersal fish, often resting directly on the seabed, sometimes partially buried in sand or mud.

Flatheads are carnivorous, feeding on small fish and crustaceans. They lie in wait buried by sand, with only their eyes poking out from the substrate. When prospective prey walks or swims close to the platycephalid's head, the flathead strikes rapidly, engulfing the prey in its large mouth. As flatheads  are ambush predators they are expected to be relatively sedentary and not move large distances as adults. However, recent research has shown that part of the population of some flathead species makes long distance movements or spawning migrations.

Fisheries
Active commercial fisheries are geared towards members of the family. In Japan, some species are the subject of experimental aquaculture programs. Flatheads are commonly caught on rod and line. The larger species are considered game fish.

See also
Flathead (fish)

References

External links
 
 Photos of several species of Crocodilefishes

Platycephaloidei
 
Fish of the Pacific Ocean
Ray-finned fish families
Taxa named by William John Swainson